Sincheon Kang clan is a Korean clan from Sinchon County, Hwanghae Province. According to a census held in 2015, the clan has 52,945 members and in a census held in 2000, the clan had 13,909 families.

The daedongbo (a compilation genealogy book of related clans) of the Sincheon Kang clan claims that Gang Hogyeong was the 67th generation descendant of Gang Hu, a grandson of King Wen of the Zhou dynasty. However, the historical veracity of that claim cannot be verified. Furthermore, the true progenitor of the Sincheon Gang clan is considered to be Gang Ji-yeon, a 14th generation descendant of Gang Hogyeong, not Gang Hogyeong himself.

Queen Jeonghwa, the great-grandmother of Taejo of Goryeo, was a member of the clan as she was the great-granddaughter of Kang Ho-gyeong, and the granddaughter of Kang Chung. The Sincheon Kang clan eventually had a separate branch that derived from them; the Goksan Kang clan. The Goksan Kang clan was founded in Goksan, Hwanghae Province and the progenitor was Kang Seo, who was the 6th great-grandson of Kang Ji-yeon and the father of Kang Yun-seong. Through Kang Yun-seong, his youngest daughter, Queen Shindeok, married Yi Seong-gye and became the second wife.  Queen Shindeok is the first Queen Consort as the “First Queen of Joseon ” of Joseon Dynasty’s first monarch. According to the 2015 Korean census, the Goksan Kang clan has 29,107 members.

See also 
 Korean clan names of foreign origin

References 

Korean clan names of Chinese origin

Gang clans